Y8 or 8-Y may refer to:

8 years
8Y, the IATA airline code for the Latvian company Air Burundi
South African Class 8Y 2-8-0 locomotive
8Y, list of Alboran Sea; see List of NATO country codes
A brand name of factor VIII (medication)

See also
Y8 (disambiguation)